Lesley Turner and Owen Davidson were the defending champions but only Turner competed that year with Bill Bowrey.

Turner and Bowrey lost in the semifinals to Margaret Court and Allan Stone.

Billie Jean King and Dick Crealy won the final on a walkover against Court and Stone.

Seeds
Champion seeds are indicated in bold text while text in italics indicates the round in which those seeds were eliminated. The top and bottom two seeded teams received byes into the second round.

Draw

Final

Top half

Bottom half

External links
 1968 Australian Championships – Doubles draws and results at the International Tennis Federation

1968 in Australian tennis
Mixed Doubles
1968